Malmi shooting range was a shooting range in the Malmi district of Helsinki, Finland, active from 1937 to 1993. The shooting range was built by the Finnish Army for the 1937 ISSF World Shooting Championships and was also used in the shooting events of the 1952 Summer Olympics.

During the World War II, Malmi shooting range was an execution site. One of the persons shot in Malmi was Martta Koskinen, the last woman executed in Finland. The shooting range was closed in 1993. Today it is a residential and recreation area which is a part of the Kivikko district.

References 

Shooting ranges in Finland
Sports venues in Helsinki
Defunct sports venues in Finland
Venues of the 1952 Summer Olympics
Sports venues completed in 1937
Sports venues demolished in 1993